Hermine and the Seven Upright Men is a 1935 German drama film based on the novella  by Gottfried Keller.

Cast 
 Heinrich George - Zimmermeister Frymann
 Karin Hardt - Hermine, seine Tochter
 Paul Henckels - Schneidermeister Hediger
 Lotte Spira - Mrs. Hediger, seine Frau
 Albert Lieven - Karl, deren Sohn
 Karel Štěpánek - Ruckstuhl, Grundstückspekulant
 Hans Henninger - Spörri
 Friedrich Ettel - Gastwirt Aklin
 Maria Krahn - Mrs. Aklin, seine Frau
 Max Holzboer - Schmied Syfrig
 Annemarie Steinsieck - Mrs. Syfrig, seine Frau
 Alfred Schlageter - Tischlermeister Bürgi
 Käthe Haack - Mrs. Bürgi, seine Frau
 Armin Schweizer - Silberschmied Kurser

References

External links 

1935 films
1935 drama films
German drama films
Films of Nazi Germany
Films directed by Frank Wisbar
Films based on works by Gottfried Keller
German black-and-white films
1930s German films
1930s German-language films